was the sixteenth of twenty-four s, built for the Imperial Japanese Navy following World War I. When introduced into service, these ships were the most powerful destroyers in the world.

History
Construction of the advanced Fubuki-class destroyers was authorized as part of the Imperial Japanese Navy's expansion program from fiscal 1923, intended to give Japan a qualitative edge with the world's most modern ships. The Fubuki class had performance that was a huge leap over previous destroyer designs, so much so that they were designated . The large size, powerful engines, high speed, large radius of action and unprecedented armament gave these destroyers the firepower similar to many light cruisers in other navies. Sagiri, built at the Uraga Dock Company was the sixth in an improved series, which incorporated a modified gun turret which could elevate her main battery of Type 3 127 mm 50 caliber naval guns to 75° as opposed to the original 40°, thus permitting the guns to be used as dual purpose guns against aircraft. Sagiri was laid down on 28 March 1929, launched on 23 December 1929 and commissioned on 31 January 1930. Originally assigned hull designation "Destroyer No. 50", she was commissioned as Sagiri.

The 4th Fleet Incident occurred only a year after her commissioning, and Sagiri was quickly taken back to the shipyards for strengthening of her hull.

Operational history
On completion, Sagiri was assigned to Destroyer Division 20 under the IJN 2nd Fleet. During the Second Sino-Japanese War, from 1937, Sagiri covered landing of Japanese forces in Shanghai and Hangzhou. From 1940, she was assigned to patrol and cover landings of Japanese forces in south China.

World War II history
At the time of the attack on Pearl Harbor, Sagiri was assigned to Destroyer Division 20 of Desron 3 of the IJN 1st Fleet, and had deployed from Kure Naval District to the port of Samah on Hainan Island.

From 17 December, Sagiri covered Japanese landings at Miri and at Kuching in Sarawak. Her aft magazine caught fire and exploded, sinking the ship with the loss of 121 of her crew. Some 120 survivors were rescued by her sister ship, .

On 15 January 1942, Sagiri was removed from the navy list.

Notes

References

Further reading

External links

Fubuki-class destroyers
Ships built by Uraga Dock Company
1929 ships
Second Sino-Japanese War naval ships of Japan
World War II destroyers of Japan
World War II shipwrecks in the South China Sea
Maritime incidents in December 1941
Ships sunk by Dutch submarines